Bungartius is an extinct genus of armoured, jawed fishes from the Late Devonian period of Ohio. Bungartius is thought to have been durophagous.

Phylogeny 
In a 2017 phylogenetic analysis, Bungartius was placed as an intermediate between Tafilachthys and Titanichthys.

See also
 List of placoderms

References

Arthrodires
Paleontology in Ohio
Fossil taxa described in 1947